This is a chronological, but incomplete, list of United States federal legislation passed by the 1st through 56th United States Congresses, between 1789 and 1901. For the main article on this subject, see List of United States federal legislation. Additional lists can be found at List of United States federal legislation: Congress of the Confederation, List of United States federal legislation, 1901–2001 and List of United States federal legislation, 2001–present.

1st United States Congress

First Session (March 4, 1789–September 29, 1789)

Second Session (January 4, 1790—August 12, 1790)

Third Session (December 6, 1790—March 3, 1791)

2nd United States Congress
 February 20, 1792: Postal Service Act, Sess. 1, ch. 7, 
 April 2, 1792: Coinage Act of 1792, Sess. 1, ch. 16, 
 April 14, 1792: Apportionment Act of 1792, Sess. 1, ch. 23  to
 May 2, 1792: First Militia Act of 1792, Sess. 1, ch. 28, 
 May 8, 1792: Second Militia Act of 1792, Sess. 1, ch. 33, 
 February 12, 1793: Fugitive Slave Law of 1793, Sess. 2, ch. 7, 
 February 18, 1793: An Act for enrolling and licensing ships or vessels to be employed in the coasting trade and fisheries, and for regulating the same, Sess. 2, ch. 8, 
 March 2, 1793: Judiciary Act of 1793, Sess. 2, ch. 22,  (including Anti-Injunction Act)

3rd United States Congress
 March 27, 1794: Naval Act of 1794, Sess. 1, ch. 12, 
 January 29, 1795: Naturalization Act of 1795, Sess. 2, ch. 20,

4th United States Congress

5th United States Congress
 April 30, 1798: The U.S. Department of the Navy was established, Sess. 2, ch. 35, 
 June 18, 1798: Alien and Sedition Acts: An Act to establish a uniform rule of naturalization (Naturalization Act of 1798), Sess. 2, ch. 54, 
 June 25, 1798: Alien and Sedition Acts: An Act concerning Aliens, Sess. 2, ch. 58, 
 July 6, 1798: Alien and Sedition Acts: An Act respecting Alien Enemies, Sess. 2, ch. 66, 
 July 9, 1798: Act Further to Protect the Commerce of the United States, Sess. 2, ch. 68, 
 July 11, 1798: The Marine Corps was established, Sess. 2, ch. 72, 
 July 14, 1798: Alien and Sedition Acts: An Act for the punishment of certain crimes against the United States (Sedition Act), Sess. 2, ch. 74, 
 July 16, 1798: An Act for the relief of sick and disabled seamen, Sess. 2, ch. 77,

6th United States Congress
 April 4, 1800: Bankruptcy Act of 1800, Sess. 1, ch. 19, 
 May 2, 1800: Slave Trade Act of 1800, Sess. 2, ch. 51, 
 February 13, 1801: Judiciary Act of 1801, Sess. 2, ch. 4, 
 February 27, 1801: District of Columbia Organic Act of 1801, Sess. 2, ch. 15,

7th United States Congress
 March 16, 1802: Military Peace Establishment Act, Sess. 1, ch. 9, 
 April 29, 1802: Judiciary Act of 1802, Sess. 1, ch. 31, 
 April 30, 1802: Enabling Act of 1802, Sess. 1, ch. 40,

8th United States Congress

 March 26, 1804: Land Act of 1804, Sess. 1, ch. 35,

9th United States Congress
 March 29, 1806: Cumberland Road, Sess. 1, ch. 19, 
 February 24, 1807: Seventh Circuit Act of 1807, Sess. 2, ch. 16, 
 March 2, 1807: Slave Trade Prohibition Act, Sess. 2, ch. 22, 
 March 3, 1807: Insurrection Act of 1807, Sess. 2, ch. 39,

10th United States Congress
 December 22, 1807: Embargo Act of 1807, Sess. 1, ch. 5, 
 April 23, 1808: Militia Act of 1808, Sess. 1, ch. 55, 
 March 1, 1809: Non-Intercourse Act (1809), Sess. 2, ch. 24,

11th United States Congress
 May 1, 1810: Macon's Bill Number 2, Sess. 2, ch. 39,

12th United States Congress
how removed data this area hade info on War of 1812. Acts of insurrection. Special powers of Congress, acts of insurrection. Special powers of candidate running for president. Need only verbally proclaim. Also the discussion. On these laws may never be deemed archaic or removed from the books by threat of death penalty. Additional areas and content. Of extreme historical value. Higher end Oracle necessary. To service. And check records of origins. Of either outside cyber attacking participants. Or other participants who have deleted access. To extremely valuable historical data referencing. Need some expert historians to restore this priority item.

13th United States Congress

April 16, 1814: Flotilla Service Act of 1814, Sess. 2, ch. 59,

14th United States Congress
 April 10, 1816: Second Bank of the United States, Sess. 1, ch. 94, 
 April 27, 1816: Dallas tariff, Sess. 1, ch. 107,

15th United States Congress
 April 4, 1818: Flag Act of 1818, Sess. 1, ch. 34, 
 April 18, 1818: Navigation Act of 1818, Sess. 1, ch. 70,

16th United States Congress
 March 6, 1820: Missouri Compromise, Sess. 1, ch. 22, 
 April 24, 1820: Land Act of 1820, Sess. 1, ch. 51, 
 March 2, 1821: Relief Act of 1821, Sess. 2, ch. 12,

17th United States Congress

18th United States Congress
 January 7, 1824: Tariff of 1824, Sess. 1, ch. 4, 
 April 30, 1824: General Survey Act, Sess. 1, ch. 46, 
 March 3, 1825: Crimes Act of 1825, Sess. 2, ch. 65,

19th United States Congress

20th United States Congress
 May 24, 1828: Tariff of Abominations, Sess. 1, ch. 111,

21st United States Congress
 May 28, 1830: Indian Removal Act, Sess. 1, ch. 148, 
 February 3, 1831: Copyright Act of 1831, Sess. 2, ch. 16,

22nd United States Congress
 July 14, 1832: Tariff of 1832, Sess. 1, ch. 227, 
 March 2, 1833: Compromise Tariff (Tariff of 1833), Sess. 2, ch. 55, 
 March 2, 1833: Force Bill, Sess. 2, ch. 57,

23rd United States Congress
 June 28, 1834: Coinage Act of 1834, Sess. 1, ch. 95, 
 June 30, 1834: An Act to Regulate Trade and Intercourse With the Indian Tribes, Sess. 1, ch. 161,

24th United States Congress

 July 4, 1836: Patent Act of 1836, Sess. 1, ch. 357, 
 March 3, 1837: Eighth and Ninth Circuits Act of 1837, Sess. 2, ch. 34,

25th United States Congress

26th United States Congress

27th United States Congress 
 August 19, 1841: Bankruptcy Act of 1841, Sess. 1, ch. 9, 
 September 4, 1841: Preemption Act of 1841, Sess. 1, ch. 16, 
 August 4, 1842: Armed Occupation Act, Sess. 2, ch. 122, 
 August 30, 1842: Tariff of 1842 ("Black Tariff"), Sess. 2, ch. 270,

28th United States Congress

 January 23, 1845: Presidential Election Day Act, Sess. 2, ch. 1, 
 March 3, 1845: An act relating to revenue cutters and steamers, Sess. 2, ch. 78,  (the first time Congress overrode a presidential veto)

29th United States Congress

 July 9, 1846: District of Columbia retrocession, Sess. 1, ch. 35, 
 July 30, 1846: Walker tariff, Sess. 1, ch. 74, 
 August 6, 1846: Independent Treasury Act of 1846, Sess. 1, ch. 90,

30th United States Congress
 March 3, 1849: Department of the Interior Act, Sess. 2, ch. 108, 
 March 3, 1849: Coinage Act of 1849, Sess. 2, ch. 109,

31st United States Congress
 September 9, 1850: Compromise of 1850, Sess. 1, ch. 49, 
 September 18, 1850: Fugitive Slave Act, Sess. 1, ch. 60, 
 September 27, 1850: Donation Land Claim Act, Sess. 1, ch. 76, 
 March 3, 1851: California Land Act of 1851, Sess. 2, ch. 41, 
 March 3, 1851: Limitation of Liability Act of 1851, Sess. 2, ch. 43,

32nd United States Congress

 February 21, 1853: Coinage Act of 1853, Sess. 2, ch. 79, 
 March 2, 1853: An act providing for administering the oath of office to William R. King, Vice President elect of the United States of America. Sess. 2, ch. 93,

33rd United States Congress
 May 30, 1854: Kansas–Nebraska Act, Sess. 1, ch. 59,

34th United States Congress
 August 18, 1856: Guano Islands Act, Sess. 1, ch. 164, 
 February 21, 1857: Coinage Act of 1857, Sess. 3, ch. 56,

35th United States Congress

36th United States Congress
 June 16, 1860: Pacific Telegraph Act of 1860, Sess. 1, ch. 137, 
 March 2, 1861: Morrill Tariff, Sess. 2, ch. 68,

37th United States Congress
 August 5, 1861: Revenue Act of 1861, Sess. 1, ch. 45, 
 August 6, 1861: Confiscation Act of 1861, Sess. 1, ch. 60, 
 February 25, 1862: Legal Tender Act of 1862, Sess. 2, ch. 33, 
 April 16, 1862: An Act for the Release of certain Persons held to Service or Labor within the District of Columbia, Sess. 2, ch. 54, 
 May 15, 1862: Department of Agriculture Act, Sess. 2, ch. 72, 
 May 20, 1862: Homestead Act of 1862, Sess. 2, ch. 75, 
 June 19, 1862: An Act to secure Freedom to all persons within the Territories of the United States, Sess. 2, ch. 111, 
 July 1, 1862: Revenue Act of 1862, Sess. 2, ch. 119, 
 July 1, 1862: Pacific Railroad Act of 1862, Sess. 2, ch. 120, 
 July 1, 1862: Morrill Anti-Bigamy Act, Sess. 2, ch. 126, 
 July 2, 1862: Morrill Act of 1862, Sess. 2, ch. 130, 
 July 17, 1862: Militia Act of 1862, Sess. 2, ch. 201, 
 February 24, 1863: Arizona Organic Act, Sess. 3, ch. 56, 
 February 25, 1863: National Bank Act of 1863, Sess. 3, ch. 58, 
 March 2, 1863: False Claims Act, Sess. 3, ch. 67, 
 March 3, 1863: Enrollment Act, Sess. 3, ch. 75, 
 March 3, 1863: Habeas Corpus Suspension Act (1863), Sess. 3, ch. 81, 
 March 3, 1863: Tenth Circuit Act of 1863, Sess. 3, ch. 100,

38th United States Congress
 April 22, 1864: Coinage Act of 1864, Sess. 1, ch. 66, 
 March 3, 1865: Freedmen's Bureau, Sess. 2, ch. 90,

39th United States Congress
 April 9, 1866: Civil Rights Act of 1866, Sess. 1, ch. 31, 
 April 12, 1866: Contraction Act of 1866, Sess. 1, ch. 39, 
 July 23, 1866: Judicial Circuits Act, Sess. 1, ch. 210, 
 March 2, 1867: Reconstruction Act, Sess. 2, ch. 153, 
 March 2, 1867: Tenure of Office Act (1867), Sess. 2, ch. 154,

40th United States Congress
Reconstruction Acts, continued:
 March 23, 1867, Sess. 1, ch. 6, 
 July 19, 1867, Sess. 1, ch. 30, 
 March 11, 1868, Sess. 2, ch. 25, 
July 27, 1868: Expatriation Act of 1868, Sess. 2, ch. 249,

41st United States Congress
 March 18, 1869: Public Credit Act of 1869, Sess. 1, ch. 1, 
 April 10, 1869: Judiciary Act of 1869 (Circuit Judges Act of 1869), Sess. 1, ch. 22, 
 May 31, 1870: Enforcement Act of 1870 (Civil Rights Act of 1870), Sess. 2, ch. 114, 
 June 22, 1870: Department of Justice Act, Sess. 2, ch. 150, 
 July 8, 1870: Copyright Act of 1870, Sess. 2, ch. 230, 
 July 12, 1870: Currency Act of 1870, Sess. 2, ch. 252, 
 July 14, 1870: Naturalization Act of 1870, Sess. 2, ch. 254, 
 July 14, 1870: Funding Act of 1870, Sess. 2, ch. 256, 
 February 21, 1871: District of Columbia Organic Act of 1871, Sess. 3, ch. 62,

42nd United States Congress
 April 20, 1871: Third Enforcement Act (Civil Rights Act of 1871, Ku Klux Klan Act), Sess. 1, ch. 22, 
 March 1, 1872: Yellowstone Act, Sess. 2, ch. 24, 
 May 10, 1872: General Mining Act of 1872, Sess. 2, ch. 152, 
 May 22, 1872: Amnesty Act, Sess. 2, ch. 193, 
 June 1, 1872: Practice Conformity Act (precursor to the Rules Enabling Act), Sess. 2, ch. 255, 
 June 8, 1872: Post Office Act (1872), Sess. 2, ch. 335, 
 February 12, 1873: Coinage Act of 1873, Sess. 3, ch. 131, 
 March 3, 1873: Comstock Act, Sess. 3, ch. 258, 
 March 3, 1873: Timber Culture Act, Sess. 3, ch. 277,

43rd United States Congress
 June 23, 1874: Poland Act, Sess. 1, ch. 469, 
 January 14, 1875: Specie Payment Resumption Act, Sess. 2, ch. 15, 
 March 1, 1875: Civil Rights Act of 1875, Sess. 2, ch. 114, 
 March 3, 1875: Page Act of 1875, Sess. 2, ch. 141,

44th United States Congress
 March 3, 1877: Desert Land Act

45th United States Congress
 February 28, 1878: Bland–Allison Act (Coinage Act (Silver Dollar)), Sess. 2, ch. 20, 
 April 29, 1878: National Quarantine Act, Sess. 2, ch. 66, 
 June 3, 1878: Timber and Stone Act, Sess. 2, ch. 151, 
 June 18, 1878: Posse Comitatus Act, Sess. 2, ch. 263, §15, 
 February 26, 1879: To Promote a Knowledge of Steam Engineering and Iron Shipbuilding Act, Sess. 3, ch. 105,

46th United States Congress

47th United States Congress
 February 25, 1882: Apportionment of the Tenth Census, Sess. 1, ch. 20, 
 May 6, 1882: Chinese Exclusion Act, Sess. 1, ch. 126, 
 August 2, 1882: River and Harbors Act of 1882
 January 16, 1883: Pendleton Civil Service Reform Act, Sess. 2, ch. 27, 
 March 3, 1883: Tariff of 1883 (Mongrel Tariff), Sess. 2, ch. 121,

48th United States Congress

49th United States Congress
 January 19, 1886: Presidential Succession Act of 1886, Sess. 1, ch. 4, 
 June 19, 1886: Passenger Vessel Services Act of 1886, Sess. 1, ch. 421, 
 February 3, 1887: Electoral Count Act, Sess. 2, ch. 90, 
 February 4, 1887: Interstate Commerce Act of 1887, Sess. 2, ch. 104, 
 February 8, 1887: Dawes Act (Indian General Allotment Act), Sess. 2, ch. 119, 
 March 2, 1887: Agricultural Experiment Stations Act of 1887, Sess. 2, ch. 314, 
 March 2, 1887: Hatch Act of 1887, Sess. 2, ch. 314, 
 March 3, 1887: Tucker Act, Sess. 2, ch. 359, 
 March 3, 1887: Edmunds–Tucker Act, Sess. 2, ch. 397,

50th United States Congress
 February 22, 1889: Enabling Act of 1889, Sess. 2, ch. 180,

51st United States Congress
 May 2, 1890: Oklahoma Organic Act, Sess. 1, ch. 182, 
 June 27, 1890: Dependent and Disability Pension Act, Sess. 1, ch. 634, 
 July 2, 1890: Sherman Antitrust Act of 1890, Sess. 1, ch. 647, 
 July 14, 1890: Sherman Silver Purchase Act, Sess. 1, ch. 708, 
 August 30, 1890: Morrill Act of 1890, Sess. 1, ch. 841, 
 October 1, 1890: McKinley Tariff, Sess. 1, ch. 1244, 
 March 3, 1891: Judiciary Act of 1891 (Evarts Act), Sess. 2, ch. 517, 
 March 3, 1891: Immigration Act of 1891, Sess. 2, ch. 551, 
 March 3, 1891: Land Revision Act of 1891, Sess. 2, ch. 561, 
 March 3, 1891: Forest Reserve Act of 1891, Sess. 2, ch. 561, 
 March 3, 1891: International Copyright Act of 1891, Sess. 2, ch. 565, 
 March 3, 1891: Merchant Marine Act of 1891

52nd United States Congress 
 May 5, 1892: Geary Act, Sess. 1, ch. 60,  (amended the Chinese Exclusion Act)
 February 13, 1893: Harter Act (Carriage of Goods by Sea), Sess. 2, ch. 105,

53rd United States Congress
 August 27, 1894: Wilson–Gorman Tariff Act, Sess. 2, ch. 349, §73, 
 January 12, 1895: Printing Act of 1895 (An Act Providing for the Public Printing and Binding and the Distribution of Public Documents), Sess. 3, ch. 23, 
 February 18, 1895: Maguire Act of 1895, Sess. 3, ch. 97,

54th United States Congress

 May 21, 1896: Oil Pipe Line Act,  ( et seq.)
 May 22, 1896: Condemned Cannon Act,  
 May 28, 1896: United States Commissioners Act, 
 June 1, 1896: Married Women's Rights Act (District of Columbia),  
 June 6, 1896: Filled Cheese Act, 
 January 13, 1897: Stock Reservoir Act, ( et seq.) 
 March 2, 1897: Tea Importation Act, ( et seq.)

55th United States Congress
 July 24, 1897: Dingley Act, Sess. 1, ch. 11, 
 April 20, 1898: Teller Amendment (Cuba), Sess. 2, Joint Res. 24, 
 April 25, 1898: Declaration of war on Spain (Spanish–American War), Sess. 2, ch. 189, 
 June 1, 1898: Erdman Act, Sess. 2, ch. 370, 
 June 13, 1898: War Revenue Act of 1898, Sess. 2, ch. 448, 
 June 28, 1898: Curtis Act of 1898, Sess. 2, ch. 517, 
 July 1, 1898: Bankruptcy Act of 1898 (Henderson-Nelson Act), Sess. 2, ch. 541, 
 July 7, 1898: Newlands Resolution, Sess. 2, Joint Res. 55, 
 March 3, 1899: Rivers and Harbors Act of 1899, Sess. 3, ch. 425,

56th United States Congress
 March 14, 1900: Gold Standard Act, Sess. 1, ch. 41, 
 April 2, 1900: Foraker Act, Sess. 1, ch. 191,  (Puerto Rico Civil Code)
 April 30, 1900: Hawaiian Organic Act, Sess. 1, ch. 339,

References 

 1789